Jeff Trotman (7 December 1943 – 29 December 1967) was an Australian rules footballer who played with Carlton in the Victorian Football League (VFL). 

He was killed in a car accident in 1967.

Notes

External links 

Jeff Trotman's profile at Blueseum

1943 births
Carlton Football Club players
Ormond Amateur Football Club players
Australian rules footballers from Victoria (Australia)
Road incident deaths in Australia
1967 deaths